Gostingen is a small town in the commune of Flaxweiler, in south-eastern Luxembourg.

Demographics 
, the town has a population of 414.

References 

Flaxweiler
Towns in Luxembourg